The Cantonese Wikipedia is the Cantonese-language edition of Wikipedia, run by the Wikimedia Foundation. It was started on 25 March 2006.

History

Cantonese, a major variety of the Chinese language originating in Guangzhou, is the lingua franca in the southern provinces of Guangdong and Guangxi, and is one of the official languages of Hong Kong and Macau. Cantonese has the most well-developed written form of all Chinese varieties apart from the standard-Mandarin variety and Classical Chinese.

With the advent of the computer and standardization of character sets specifically for Cantonese, many printed materials in predominantly Cantonese speaking areas of the world cater to their population using these written Cantonese characters.

Naming
The Cantonese name of Wikipedia was decided in April 2006, following a vote. In a similar manner to the existing Chinese Wikipedia, the name of Cantonese Wikipedia means "Wiki Encyclopedia". The name can be interpreted as "the encyclopedia that connects the fundamental knowledge of humanity".

The discussion in 2006 also decided the Cantonese name of the word "Cantonese" in the wiki. The result was "". In a vote from August to September 2013 it was decided that the name be changed to "", which literally means "Cantonese inscription".

ISO code
At the time of establishment, there was no ISO code for Cantonese. Thus,  was used as the domain. However, some did not like the idea, as Yue is the Mandarin name of Cantonese. The native name is Yuet. Cantonese preserves entering tone while Mandarin does not. Some suggested using Cantonese instead, but zh-yue was chosen as the final domain name.

Using the ISO code instead of current domain has been submitted as a proposal to Wikimedia, but as of yet, no action has been taken to implement this change.

Native name
There are various native names of Cantonese, namely Gwóng jàu wá, Gwóng fú wá, Gwóng dùng wá and Yuht yúh. There is no consensus on the native name.

Community

Cantonese flourishes in the southern provinces of Guangdong and Guangxi, as well as in Hong Kong and Macau where it is listed as one of their official languages. Some Cantonese speakers are native to Vietnam, Thailand, Singapore, Malaysia, Indonesia, Australia, Canada, the United States and United Kingdom.

Hong Kong owns the largest written Cantonese assets and does not have tight internet censorship. Fittingly, most editors are Hong Kongers.

Starting from a small community, Cantonese Wikipedians have formed a consensus to follow, by default, the policies, guidelines, and customs of the English Wikipedia, wherever they are applicable. This consensus has provided stability and allows Wikipedians to concentrate on content.

Origin of edits

Origin of readers

Script
There are two different scripts of written Cantonese, Traditional Chinese and Simplified Chinese. Some Cantonese-specific characters can only be written in Traditional Chinese. Cantonese Wikipedia uses Traditional following Hong Kong and Macau in their traditional usage, because most of the participants came from Hong Kong when Cantonese Wikipedia was founded. But this led to a dissatisfaction among Simplified Chinese users (mainly Cantonese speakers in Guangdong). To solve this problem, a JavaScript converter was created and provided for viewing the content in Simplified Chinese characters.

Unlike Chinese Wikipedia (where replacing a form of writing with another in source text is prohibited), if an editor writes a page in Simplified characters, he or she will not receive any warning from administrators, but the text will be manually converted to Traditional characters.

Other Chinese-language Wikipedias 
Cantonese is a member of the group of Chinese varieties. Different Wikipedias have been established for different Chinese varieties (see below). The Cantonese Wikipedia is the third largest in this family.
 Chinese Wikipedia (based on Standard Chinese)
 Classical Chinese Wikipedia
 Min Nan Wikipedia
 Mindong Wikipedia
 Gan Wikipedia
 Wu Wikipedia
 Hakka Wikipedia

See also 
 Chinese encyclopedias

References

 Wikimedia Mail:   (December 2004),  (January 2005),  (February 2005),   (September 2005)

External links

  Cantonese Wikipedia

Internet properties established in 2004
Wikipedias by language
Chinese online encyclopedias
Wikipedias in Sinitic languages